Mount Westmore is an American hip hop supergroup composed of California-based rappers Snoop Dogg, E-40, Too Short, and Ice Cube. Formed in late 2020, the group's debut album was initially released via blockchain mid-2022 under the title "'Bad MF's'". The album was released on streaming services on December 9, 2022, and included unreleased tracks which were not featured on the original version under the new title "Snoop Cube 40 $hort".

History 
Members Too Short and E-40 have been releasing collaborative songs since the mid-1990s, with their debut collaborative albums History: Function Music and History: Mob Music being released in 2012. Creation of a supergroup was in discussion shortly thereafter, but never came to fruition until December 2020.

In a 2021 interview with DJ Vlad, Too Short stated that the group's debut album would be followed up with "volumes", similar in style to his release of The Pimp Tape (2018). In April 2021, the group performed a song titled "Big Subwoofer" at the Jake Paul vs. Ben Askren fight. The song was officially released on October 20, 2021, alongside its music video for Snoop Dogg's Def Jam debut compilation Snoop Dogg Presents Algorithm.

On October 11, Ice Cube announced the "Too Big" single release date which came out on October 21. Their debut album, titled Snoop Cube 40 $hort, officially released on December 9, 2022 on all digital platforms with a CD release to follow.

While being interviewed on an episode of Hot Ones, Rapper E-40 was asked who is Mount Rushmore of West Coast rappers is. His response was Himself, Ice Cube, Too Short and Snoop. A short time later the group formed and started making music.

Discography

Studio albums

Singles

References 

Hip hop supergroups
West Coast hip hop groups
Snoop Dogg
Ice Cube
Musical groups established in 2020